Kisei (棋聖) is an honorary title and Go competition. The title, meaning Go Sage in Japanese, was a traditional honorary appellation given to a handful of players down the centuries. The element ki can also apply to shogi, and there were also recognized kisei in the shogi world.

Background
Kisei is a Go competition organised by the Japanese Nihon Ki-in. The competition began in 1976 by the Yomiuri Shimbun newspaper and is currently the highest paying competition in Japanese professional Go, paying ¥45,000,000 (approx. $557,000 as of 29 June 2011) to the winner in 2011. The word Kisei is Japanese for "Go Sage", which is why before the Kisei tournament began, the only players who were given the title "Kisei" were Dōsaku and Hon′inbō Shūsaku.

The holder is challenged by whoever wins the round robin league. Players can get into the round robin league by going through many preliminary tournaments. Once there is a challenger to compete against the holder, the winner is decided through a best of seven match. The games are played over two days and each player is given eight hours of thinking time. If a player qualifies for the Kisei league, they are automatically promoted to 7 dan. If that same player wins the league, a promotion to 8 dan is given. If that same player goes on to winning the title, they are promoted to 9 dan, the highest rank.

Past winners

Honorary winners 

A Go player who has held the title for five consecutive years, or won the title a total of ten times or more, has qualified himself to become "Honorary Kisei" after retiring or after the age of 60.

Fujisawa Hideyuki 1977–1982
Kobayashi Koichi 1986–1993
Iyama Yuta 2013–2021

References

External links
 Official Kisei page of Yomiuri Shinbun (in Japanese)
 Kisei title games

 
Go competitions in Japan